Assumption Parish is a parish located in the U.S. state of Louisiana. As of the 2020 census, the population was 21,039. Its parish seat is Napoleonville. Assumption Parish was established in 1807, as one of the original parishes of the Territory of Orleans.

Assumption Parish is one of the twenty-two Acadiana parishes. Its major product is sugar cane.  In proportion to its area, Assumption Parish produces the most sugar of any parish of Louisiana.

History 

In 1807, Assumption became the eighth parish of the Orleans Territory. Its history is rooted in its waterways and its large expanse of fertile soils ideal for farming. Settled in the middle 18th century by French and Spanish settlers, the area retains strong cultural ties to its past with conversational French still common among residents.  Assumption was also a final destination for many of the French Acadians exiled from Nova Scotia between 1755 and 1764.

After the Confederacy forced the surrender of Fort Sumter, South Carolina, in 1861, the Assumption Parish Police Jury appropriated $1,000 to provide uniforms for military volunteers against the Union. By contrast, Lafayette Parish contributed $6,000. Plaquemines Parish approved a gift of $10 to $15 per month for needy volunteer families.

Geography

Major highways 
  Future Interstate 49
  U.S. Highway 90
  Louisiana Highway 1
 Louisiana Highway 70

Adjacent parishes 

 Iberville Parish (north)
 Ascension Parish  (north)
 St. James Parish  (northeast)
 Lafourche Parish  (east)
 Terrebonne Parish  (southeast)
 St. Mary Parish  (southwest)
 Iberia Parish  (northwest)
 St. Martin Parish  (west)

Demographics

2020 census

As of the 2020 United States census, there were 21,039 people, 8,552 households, and 5,484 families residing in the parish.

2010 census
As of the 2010 United States census, there were 23,421 people living in the parish. 66.8% were White, 30.5% Black or African American, 0.6% Native American, 0.2% Asian, 0.1% Pacific Islander, 1.0% of some other race and 0.9% of two or more races. 2.1% were Hispanic or Latino (of any race). 38.2% were of French, French Canadian or Cajun and 9.4% American ancestry.

2000 census
As of the census of 2000, there were 23,388 people, 8,239 households, and 6,311 families living in the parish.  The population density was 69 people per square mile (27/km2).  There were 9,635 housing units at an average density of 28 per square mile (11/km2).  The racial makeup of the parish was 67.17% White, 31.52% Black or African American, 0.31% Native American, 0.24% Asian, 0.01% Pacific Islander, 0.17% from other races, and 0.59% from two or more races.  1.21% of the population were Hispanic or Latino of any race. 81.14% of the population over the age of five spoke only English at home, while 17.58% reported speaking French or Cajun French .

There were 8,239 households, out of which 37.90% had children under the age of 18 living with them, 56.80% were married couples living together, 14.90% had a female householder with no husband present, and 23.40% were non-families. 20.30% of all households were made up of individuals, and 9.20% had someone living alone who was 65 years of age or older.  The average household size was 2.81 and the average family size was 3.26.

In the parish the age distribution of the population shows 28.50% under the age of 18, 9.80% from 18 to 24, 28.70% from 25 to 44, 22.20% from 45 to 64, and 10.90% who were 65 years of age or older.  The median age was 34 years. For every 100 females there were 93.90 males.  For every 100 females age 18 and over, there were 90.90 males.

The median income for a household in the parish was $31,168, and the median income for a family was $36,052. Males had a median income of $35,941 versus $18,065 for females. The per capita income for the parish was $14,008.  About 19.50% of families and 21.80% of the population were below the poverty line, including 28.40% of those under age 18 and 21.70% of those age 65 or over.

Education
The Assumption Parish School Board operates local public schools. Assumption High School serves the whole parish. There is one private school in the parish, Saint Elizabeth School, which was founded in 1834.
 Assumption High School
 Bayou L'Ourse Primary School
 Belle Rose Middle School
 Belle Rose Primary School
 Labadieville Middle School
 Labadieville Primary School
 Napoleonville Middle School
 Napoleonville Primary School
 Pierre Part Elementary School
 Saint Elizabeth School

National Guard
The 928th Sapper Company, a unit of the 769th Engineer Battalion and the 225th Engineer Brigade.

Communities

Village 

 Napoleonville  (parish seat and only municipality)

Census-designated places
 Bayou Corne
 Bayou L'Ourse
 Belle Rose
 Labadieville
 Paincourtville
 Pierre Part
 Supreme

Other unincorporated communities
 Albemarle
 Belle Alliance
 Belle River
 Bruly St. Martin
 Cancienne
 Foley
 Klotzville
 Plattenville
 Westfield
 Wildwood
 Woodlawn

Politics
Assumption Parish is represented in the Louisiana House of Representatives by Beryl Amedee, a Republican, and Chad Brown, a Democrat.
During the "Solid South" era, conflicts over trade policy often caused Assumption Parish to deviate somewhat from overwhelming Democratic support, as did rebellion in the Acadiana region against Woodrow Wilson's perceived hostility towards France. 

Since the Dixiecrat revolt, by contrast, Assumption has been a typical rural South Louisiana parish in its political behaviour. It backed Dixiecrat Strom Thurmond in 1948 and Dwight D. Eisenhower in 1956 before showing powerful pro-Catholic behaviour in 1960 and then turning powerfully against liberal Midwestern Democrats in 1968 and 1972. With the nomination of the more centrist Southerner Jimmy Carter in 1976, Assumption became again Democratic leaning until the 2000s, when, like all of the rural white South, it has turned powerfully Republican due to disagreements with the Democratic Party's liberal views on social issues.

Notable people 
 Kim Willoughby, American indoor volleyball player, 2008 U.S. volleyball Olympian, former University of Hawaii volleyball player, 2003 AVCA NCAA National Player of the Year
 Charles Melançon, former Democratic member of the United States House of Representatives
 Troy E. Brown, a former member of the Louisiana State Senate
 Brandon Jacobs, two-time Super bowl winner, former running back for the New York Giants
 Johnny Meads, is a former professional American football linebacker in the National Football League Houston Oilers Washington Redskins
 J. E. Jumonville Sr., was a businessman, farmer, and horse breeder born in Paincourtville state senator
 Samuel A. LeBlanc I, was a lawyer from Napoleonville born in Paincourtville in Assumption Parish
 Whitmell P. Martin, was a U.S. Representative from Assumption Parish Louisiana from 1915-1929.

See also
 Bayou Corne sinkhole
 National Register of Historic Places listings in Assumption Parish, Louisiana
 Isleños in Louisiana#Valenzuela
 Troy E. Brown
 Samuel A. LeBlanc I
 J. E. Jumonville Sr.

References

 
Louisiana parishes
Parishes in Acadiana
Acadiana
1807 establishments in the Territory of Orleans
Populated places established in 1807